The 51st Cannes Film Festival was held from 13 to 24 May 1998.  American director, producer, screenwriter, and film historian Martin Scorsese was the Jury President. The Palme d'Or went to the Greek film Mia aioniotita kai mia mera by Theo Angelopoulos.

The festival opened with Primary Colors, directed by Mike Nichols, and closed with Godzilla, directed by Roland Emmerich. Isabelle Huppert was the mistress of ceremonies.

In 1998, two new sections were added to the Official Selection, the Un Certain Regard and the Cinéfondation. The aim of the Cinéfondation section is to support the creation of works of cinema in the world and to contribute to the entry of the new scenario writers in the circle of the celebrities. For this, fifteen to twenty short and medium-length films by students from film schools from around the world are selected and the best three are awarded by the Cinéfondation and Short films Jury. Section Un Certain Regard "awards young talent and encourages innovative and audacious works by presenting one of the films with a grant to aid its distribution in France". Lulu on the Bridge, directed by Paul Auster, opened the Un Certain Regard section.

Juries

Main competition
The following people were appointed as the Jury for the feature films of the 1998 Official Selection:
Martin Scorsese (USA) Jury President
Alain Corneau (France)
Chiara Mastroianni (France, Italy)
Chen Kaige (China)
Lena Olin (Sweden)
MC Solaar (France)
Michael Winterbottom (UK)
Sigourney Weaver (USA)
Winona Ryder (USA)
Zoe Valdes (Cuba)

Un Certain Regard
The following people were appointed as the Jury of the 1998 Un Certain Regard:
Jacques Mandelbaum
Luc Honorez
Pierre Murat
Thierry Gandillot

Cinéfondation and short films
The following people were appointed as the Jury of the Cinéfondation and short films competition:
Jean-Pierre Jeunet (France) President
Jaco Van Dormael (Belgium)
Emmanuelle Béart (France)
Arnaud Desplechin (France)
Ángela Molina (Spain)

Camera d'Or
The following people were appointed as the Jury of the 1998 Camera d'Or:
Anh Hung Tran (director) President
Bernard Maltaverne (administration)
Charlie Van Damme (Directeur de la photographie)
Derek Malcolm (critic)
Emanuela Martini (critic)
Jacques Poitrenaud (director)
Marcel Martin (critic)
Pierre Salvadori (director)

Official selection

In competition - Feature film
The following feature films competed for the Palme d'Or:

 April (Aprile) by Nanni Moretti
 The Celebration (Festen) by Thomas Vinterberg
 Claire Dolan by Lodge Kerrigan
 Class Trip (La classe de neige) by Claude Miller
 Dance Me to My Song by Rolf de Heer
 The Dreamlife of Angels (La vie rêvée des anges) by Erick Zonca
 Eternity and a Day (Mia aioniotita kai mia mera) by Theodoros Angelopoulos
 Fear and Loathing in Las Vegas by Terry Gilliam
 Flowers of Shanghai (Hai shang hua) by Hou Hsiao-hsien
 Foolish Heart (Corazón iluminado) by Héctor Babenco
 The General by John Boorman
 The Hole (Dong) by Tsai Ming-liang
 Henry Fool by Hal Hartley
 The Idiots (Idioterne) by Lars von Trier
 Illuminata by John Turturro
 Khrustalyov, My Car! (Khrustalyov, mashinu!) by Aleksei German
 Life Is Beautiful (La vita è bella) by Roberto Benigni
 My Name Is Joe by Ken Loach
 The School of Flesh (L'école de la chair) by Benoît Jacquot
 Those Who Love Me Can Take the Train (Ceux qui m'aiment prendront le train) by Patrice Chéreau
 Velvet Goldmine by Todd Haynes
 La vendedora de rosas by Víctor Gaviria

Un Certain Regard
The following films were selected for the competition of Un Certain Regard:

 All the Little Animals by Jeremy Thomas
 The Apostle by Robert Duvall
 The Apple (La Pomme) by Samira Makhmalbaf
 August 32nd on Earth (Un 32 août sur terre) by Denis Villeneuve
 Daun di Atas Bantal by Garin Nugroho
 El evangelio de las maravillas by Arturo Ripstein
 For Sale (À vendre) by Laetitia Masson
 The Impostors by Stanley Tucci
 In the Presence of a Clown (Larmar och gör sig till) by Ingmar Bergman
 Island, Alicia by Ken Yunome
 Killer (Tueur à gages) by Darezhan Omirbaev
 Little Tony (Kleine Teun) by Alex van Warmerdam
 Louise (Take 2) by Siegfried
 Love is the Devil by John Maybury
 Lulu on the Bridge by Paul Auster
 The Man Who Couldn't Open Doors by Paul Arden
 The Mutants (Os mutantes) by Teresa Villaverde
 One Evening After the War (Un soir après la guerre) by Rithy Panh
 Passion (Szenvedély) by György Fehér
 Places in Cities (Plätze in Städten) by Angela Schanelec
 The Power of Kangwon Province by Hong Sang-soo
 Rehearsals for War (Teatro di guerra) by Mario Martone
 River of Gold (O Rio do Ouro) by Paulo Rocha
 The Shoe (Kurpe) by Laila Pakalniņa
 Tell Me I'm Dreaming (Dis-moi que je rêve) by Claude Mouriéras
 Tokyo Eyes by Jean-Pierre Limosin
 Zero Effect by Jake Kasdan

Films out of competition
The following films were selected to be screened out of competition:

 Anxiety (Inquietude) by Manoel de Oliveira *
 Blues Brothers 2000 by John Landis
 Dark City by Alex Proyas *
 Godzilla by Roland Emmerich
 Goodbye Lover by Roland Joffé *
 Dr. Akagi (Kanzo Sensei) by Shohei Imamura *
 Primary Colors by Mike Nichols
 Tango by Carlos Saura *

* Special screenings

Cinéfondation
The following films were selected for the competition of Cinéfondation:

 Blue City by David Birdsell
 Deer Men by Saara Saarela
 Die Weiche by Chrys Krikellis
 Doom and Gloom by John McKay
 The First Sin by Fahimeh Sorkhabi
 Inside the Boxes by Mirjam Kubescha
 Jakub by Adam Guzinski
 Mud (Kal) by Ivaylo P. Simidchiev
 Mangwana by Manu Kurewa
 One Eye by Liana Dognini
 The Photographer (Fotograf) by Alexander Kott
 The Rose of the Railroad (Ratapenkan Ruusu) by Hanna Maylett
 The Sheep Thief by Asif Kapadia
 Summer-Time (Léto - cas dlouhých letu) by Ramunas Greicius
 Wild Paths (Sentieri selvaggi) by Susanna Grigoletto

Short film competition
The following short films competed for the Short Film Palme d'Or:

 9'8 M/S2 by Alfonso Amador, Nicolas Mendez
 Balkanska Ruleta by Zdravko Barisic
 Enfant, Gribouillage, Photos de Famille by Jun-hong Lin
 Fetch by Lynn-Maree Danzey
 Gasman by Lynne Ramsay
 Happy Birthday to Me by Martin Mahon
 Horseshoe by David Lodge
 I Want You by Gregory Quail
 Kiyida by Ebru Yapici
 L'Interview by Xavier Giannoli
 Skate by Eun-Ryung Cho

Parallel sections

International Critics' Week
The following films were screened for the 37th International Critics' Week (37e Semaine de la Critique):

Feature film competition

 The Bed (Postel) by Oskar Reif (Czech Republic)
 Christmas in August by Hur Jin-Ho (South Korea)
 I Stand Alone (Seul contre tous) by Gaspar Noé (France)
 Memory & Desire by Niki Caro (New Zealand)
 The Polish Bride (De Poolse bruid)) by Karim Traïdia (Netherlands)
 Sitcom by François Ozon (France)
 Torrente, el brazo tonto de la ley by Santiago Segura (Spain)

Short film competition

 Brutalos by Christophe Billeter, David Leroy (Switzerland)
 Down, Across (Loddrett, Vannrett) by Erland Øverby (Norway)
 Flight by Sim Sadler (United States)
 Der Hausbesorger by Stephan Wagner (Austria)
 Milk by Andrea Arnold (United Kingdom)
 Por un infante difunto by Tinieblas González (Spain)
 The Rogers’ Cable by Jennifer Kierans (Canada)

Directors' Fortnight
The following films were screened for the 1998 Directors' Fortnight (Quinzaine des Réalizateurs):

 Babyface by Jack Blum
 Cantique de la racaille by Vincent Ravalec
 Chacun pour soi by Bruno Bontzolakis
 Disparus by Gilles Bourdos
 Happiness by Todd Solondz
 Head On by Ana Kokkinos
 High Art by Lisa Cholodenko
 Hinterland (L’Arrière pays) by Jacques Nolot
 L’homme qui rit by Paul Leni
 Laisse un peu d'amour by Zaïda Ghorab-Volta
 Last Night by Don McKellar
 Le Nain rouge by Yvan Le Moine
 Notes of Love (La Parola amore esiste) by Mimmo Calopresti
 Of Freaks and Men (Pro urodov i lyudey) by Alexeï Balabanov
 Requiem by Alain Tanner
 Slam by Marc Levin
 Slums Of Beverly Hills by Tamara Jenkins
 Spring In My Hometown by Kwangmo Lee
 The Stringer by Paul Pawlikowski
 La Vie Sur Terre by Abderrahmane Sissako
 West Beyrouth by Ziad Doueiri

Short films

 A table by Idit Cébula (19 min.)
 Le Bleu du ciel by Christian Dor (25 min.)
 Open Bodies (Les corps ouverts) by Sébastien Lifshitz (47 min.)
 Electrons statiques by Jean-Marc Moutout (25 min.)
 Les Pinces à linge by Joël Brisse (23 min.)
 Rue bleue by Chad Chenouga (24 min.)

Awards

Official awards
The following films and people received the 1998 Official selection awards:
Palme d'Or: Eternity and a Day (Mia aioniotita kai mia mera) by Theodoros Angelopoulos
Grand Prize of the Jury: Life Is Beautiful (La vita è bella) by Roberto Benigni
Best Director: John Boorman for The General
Best Screenplay: Henry Fool by Hal Hartley
Best Actress: Élodie Bouchez and Natacha Régnier for The Dreamlife of Angels (La vie rêvée des anges)
Best Actor: Peter Mullan for My Name Is Joe
 Best Artistic Contribution: Velvet Goldmine by Todd Haynes
Jury Prize: 
 The Celebration (Festen) by Thomas Vinterberg
 Class Trip (La classe de neige) by Claude Miller
Un Certain Regard
Un Certain Regard Award: Tueur à gages by Darezhan Omirbayev
Cinéfondation
 First Prize: Jakub by Adam Guzinski
 Second Prize: The Sheep Thief by Asif Kapadia
 Third Prize: Mangwana by Manu Kurewa
Golden Camera
Caméra d'Or: Slam by Marc Levin
Short Films
Short Film Palme d'Or: L'interview by Xavier Giannoli
Jury Prize: Horseshoe by David Lodge & Gasman by Lynne Ramsay

Independent awards
FIPRESCI Prizes
 The Hole (Dong) by Tsai Ming-liang (In competition)
 Happiness by Todd Solondz (Directors' Fortnight)
Commission Supérieure Technique
 Technical Grand Prize: Vittorio Storaro (cinematography) in Tango
Ecumenical Jury
 Prize of the Ecumenical Jury: Eternity and a Day (Mia aioniotita kai mia mera) by Theodoros Angelopoulos
 Ecumenical Jury - Special award: Ingmar Bergman
Award of the Youth
Foreign Film: Last Night by Don McKellar
French Film: L'arrière pays by Jacques Nolot
Awards in the frame of International Critics' Week
Mercedes-Benz Award: I Stand Alone (Seul contre tous) by Gaspar Noé
Canal+ Award: Por un infante difunto by Tinieblas González
Grand Golden Rail: The Polish Bride (De Poolse bruid)) by Karim Traïdia
Small Golden Rail: Down, Across (Loddrett, Vannrett) by Erland Øverby
Awards in the frame of Directors' Fortnight
Kodak Short Film Award: Open Bodies (Les corps ouverts) by Sébastien Lifshitz & Rue bleue by Chad Chenouga
Gras Savoye Award: Rue bleue by Chad Chenouga
Association Prix François Chalais
François Chalais Award: West Beyrouth by Ziad Doueiri

References

Media
INA: Opening of the 1998 Festival (commentary in French)
INA: List of prize-winners of the 1998 festival (commentary in French)

External links

1998 Cannes Film Festival (web.archive)
Official website Retrospective 1998 
Cannes Film Festival Awards 1998 at Internet Movie Database

Cannes Film Festival, 1998
Cannes Film Festival, 1998
Cannes Film Festival, 1998
Cannes Film Festival
Cannes